Taihe Rye Music is a C-pop (Mandopop) record label, founded in China 2004 by Song Ke and Zhang Yadong.

History
The company was founded in 1996, originally as a subsidiary of Warner Music Group. In 2004 Taihe Rye Music broke away from Warner to form its own independent record label in China. It is divided into several sub-labels.

Artists
 Aduo (阿朵)
 Sophie Chen (陈倩倩)
 Bessie Guo (郭芯语)
 Shawn Huang (黄征)
 Back Dorm Boys
 Li Yuchun 2005-2009(李宇春/Chris Lee)
 Long Kuan (龙宽)
 Man Wenjun (满文军)
 Sha Baoliang (沙宝亮)
 Zhang Yadong
 M.I.C.

See also
 C-pop
 Super Girl

References

External links
www.trmusic.com.cn/main

Chinese record labels
Pop record labels
Companies based in Beijing
Chinese companies established in 2004